Woodside is a surname. Notable persons with that name include:

 Arch G. Woodside (born 1943), American marketing author, consultant, and professor
 Ben Woodside (born 1985), American basketball player
 Brad Woodside (born 1948), Canadian politician
 D. B. Woodside (born 1969), American actor
 Dennis Woodside (born 1969), American business executive
 Henry Joseph Woodside (1858–1929), Canadian businessman, journalist, writer, and photographer
 Keith Woodside (born 1964), American football player
 Logan Woodside (born 1995), American football player
 Lyndon Woodside (1935–2005), American conductor
 Maxine Woodside (born 1948), Mexican radio and television host
 Paul Woodside (born 1963), American football player
 Robert E. Woodside (1904–1998), American politician and judge
 Willson Woodside (1905–1991), Canadian journalist